In enzymology, an acetylglutamate kinase is an enzyme that catalyzes the chemical reaction:

ATP + N-acetyl-L-glutamate  ADP + N-acetyl-L-glutamyl 5-phosphate

Thus, the two substrates of this enzyme are ATP and N-acetyl-L-glutamate, whereas its two products are ADP and N-acetyl-L-glutamyl 5-phosphate.

This enzyme belongs to the family of transferases, specifically those transferring phosphorus-containing groups (phosphotransferases) with a carboxy group as acceptor.  This enzyme participates in urea cycle and metabolism of amino groups.

Nomenclature 

The systematic name of this enzyme class is ATP:N-acetyl-L-glutamate 5-phosphotransferase. Other names in common use include:
 N-acetylglutamate 5-phosphotransferase, 
 acetylglutamate phosphokinase, 
 N-acetylglutamate phosphokinase, 
 N-acetylglutamate kinase, and 
 N-acetylglutamic 5-phosphotransferase.

Structural studies 

References 

 
 
 

EC 2.7.2
Enzymes of known structure